Consort Kanghuizhuangshuli (康惠莊淑麗妃; late 14th century – 1424), of the Korean Cheongju Han clan, was a consort of the Yongle Emperor.

Biography 
Joseon sent a total of 114 women as tribute to the Ming dynasty, consisting of 16 virgin girls including Lady Han who was chosen as an imperial concubine of the Yongle Emperor because of her outstanding beauty.

In 1421, she was implicated in the alleged plot which resulted in the mass execution in the emperor's harem, where many of the emperor's concubines, their maids and eunuchs were executed, accused of having participated in a murder plot against the emperor. 

She managed to avoid being executed but was imprisoned. When the emperor died in 1424, she belonged to the 30 people executed in order to join the emperor by being buried with him.

After the Hongxi Emperor ascended, Consort Li knelt down and begged the new emperor to let her return to  Joseon to support her elderly mother but the Hongxi Emperor didn't allow her and ordered to have Consort Li hanged and buried with the late emperor. Consort Li was posthumously granted the title of Consort Kanghuizhuangshuli.

Family 
Consort Li was born in the Cheongju Han clan, one of the most proeminent korean clans who produced 6 Queens during the Joseon Dynasty.
Father: Han Yeong-jeong (한영정, 韓永矴)
Mother: Lady Kim of the Uiseong Kim clan (정경부인 의성 김씨) (? - 13 March 1423)
Three younger brothers:
First younger brother: Han Hwak (한확, 韓確; 1400 – 1456) served as Left State Councillor and Right State Councillor during the Joseon dynasty. He is the father Queen Insu, mother of the future King Seongjong of Joseon.
Younger sister: Han Gye-ran (한계란, 韓桂蘭) (1410 - 1483), Consort Gongshen; consort of the Xuande Emperor

Titles 
During the reign of the Hongwu Emperor (r. 1368–1398):
Lady Han, of the Cheongju Han clan (清州韓氏)
During the reign of the Yongle Emperor (r. 1402– 1424):
Consort Li (麗妃)
 Consort Kanghuizhuangshuli (康惠莊淑麗妃)

References 

Year of birth unknown
1424 deaths
Consorts of the Yongle Emperor
15th-century Chinese women